Below are the squads for the 2018 CONIFA World Football Cup.

For the 2018 edition of the CONIFA World Football Cup, the tournament expanded to 16 teams. Preliminary squads were published by CONIFA on 1 May 2018, with the exceptions of Matabeleland and Kabylia, who delayed their squad announcements for political reasons. Felvidék failed to submit their squad by the deadline and left the tournament to be replaced by Kárpátalja. Final squads were published on 16 May 2018.

The number of caps listed for each player does not include any matches played after the start of the 2018 CONIFA World Football Cup. The club listed is the club for which the player last played a competitive match prior to the tournament.

Group A

Barawa

Head Coach:  Abdikarim Farah

Cascadia

Head Coach:  James Nichols

Ellan Vannin

Head Coach:  Chris Bass, Sr

Tamil Eelam

Head Coach:  Ragesh Nambiar

Group B

Abkhazia

Head Coach:  Beslan Ajinjal

Kárpátalja

Head Coach:  István Sándor

Northern Cyprus

Head Coach:  Mustafa Borataş

Tibet

Head Coach:  Penpa Tsering

Group C

Matabeleland

Head Coach:  Justin Walley

Padania

Head Coach:  Arturo Merlo

Székely Land

Head Coach:  Róbert Ilyés

Tuvalu

Head Coach:  Lopati Taupili

Group D

Kabylia

Head Coach:  Lyes Immemai

Panjab

Head Coach:  Reuben Hazell

United Koreans in Japan

Head Coach:  An Yong-hak

Western Armenia

Head Coach:  Harutyun Vardanyan

References

CONIFA World Football Cup squads